Passos Maia is a municipality in the state of Santa Catarina in the South region of Brazil.

The municipality contains part of the Araucárias National Park, a  conservation unit created in 2005.

See also
List of municipalities in Santa Catarina

References

Municipalities in Santa Catarina (state)